Tuber microspiculatum is a species of truffle in the family Tuberaceae. Found in China, it was described as new to science in 2012. It is distinguished microscopically from other similar truffles by the honeycomb-like ornamentation on the surface of its spores.

Taxonomy
The species was first described in the journal Mycotaxon in 2012. The type collection was made at a mushroom market in Kunming, China (Yunnan Province) in 2012. The specific epithet microspiculatum refers to the characteristic surface ornamentation of the spores.

Description
The smooth peridium (outer skin) is 200–250 μm thick, and made of two distinct layers of tissue. The outer layer, generally 50–100 μm thick, is made of somewhat angular to roughly spherical cells that are 7.5–15 μm wide, with yellowish-brown walls. The intensity of the coloring increases approaching the outer surface of the peridium. The inner layer of the peridium is made of thin-walled, hyaline (translucent) hyphae measuring 2.5–5 μm wide.

The internal spore-bearing tissue of the truffle, the gleba, has a brown to reddish-brown color in mature specimens. It has many thin, branched, yellowish-white veins throughout, which give it a "marbled" appearance. The asci (spore-bearing cells) are roughly spherical, elliptical, or irregular in shape, contain between two and four spores (rarely only a single spore), and measure 60–85 by 55–70 μm. The spores are elliptical and typically have dimensions of 22.5–35 by 17.5–22.5 μm, although spores that originated from single-spored asci are larger (42.5–45 by 22.5–25 μm). The surface of the spores features a honeycomb-like reticulum (network or ridges) punctuated by spines measuring 2.5–4 μm. The meshes of the reticulum are numerous and tiny.

References

External links
 

Edible fungi
Fungi described in 2012
Fungi of China
microspiculatum
Truffles (fungi)